Morgantown Historic District may refer to:

Morgantown Historic District (Morgantown, Indiana), in Morgan County, Indiana
Morgantown Historic District (Morgantown, Pennsylvania), in Berks County, Pennsylvania
Morgantown Historic District (Marshall, Virginia), in Fauquier County, Virginia
Downtown Morgantown Historic District, in Monongalia County, West Virginia